Raymond J. Mooney is an American computer scientist, professor of computer science, and director of the Artificial Intelligence laboratory at the University of Texas at Austin. His research focuses on machine learning and natural language processing.

He was educated at O'Fallon Township High School in O'Fallon, Illinois and earned a BS, MS, and Ph.D. in computer science at the University of Illinois at Urbana-Champaign, where he was advised by Gerald DeJong.

He is a fellow of the Association for Computing Machinery (ACM), Association for Computational Linguistics (ACL), and Association for the Advancement of Artificial Intelligence (AAAI).

References 

Living people
Year of birth missing (living people)
University of Texas at Austin faculty
Fellows of the Association for Computing Machinery
Natural language processing researchers
Machine learning researchers
Computer scientists